Kunzea badjaensis is a flowering plant in the myrtle family, Myrtaceae and is endemic to a small area of New South Wales. It is a shrub with egg-shaped leaves and clusters of white flowers near the end of the branches. It grows at high altitudes on the Southern Tablelands.

Description
The flowers are arranged in rounded heads near the ends of the branches which often continue to grow during flowering.

Taxonomy and naming
Kunzea badjaensis was first formally described in 2016 by Hellmut R. Toelken and the description was published in Journal of the Adelaide Botanic Garden. The specific epithet (badjaensis) is a reference to Big Badja Hill, one of the places where this species is found. It had previously been known as Kunzea sp. Wadbilliga (Rodd 6168).

Distribution and habitat

Use in horticulture
Most individuals of K. badjaensis are low shrubs but a particularly low-growing form has been registered as a cultivar known as Kunzea 'Badja Carpet'. This horticultural form grows best in well-drained soil in a sunny position.

References

badjaensis
Flora of New South Wales
Myrtales of Australia
Plants described in 2016
Endemic flora of Australia
Taxa named by Hellmut R. Toelken